Perdermi [in English: "Lose Myself"] is the fourth studio album by Italian Pop duo Zero Assoluto. The album was released in May 2011, in Italy.

Singles
 The debut single is Questa estate strana [in English: "This weird summer"], released in April 2011. The single subsequently became a commercial and broadcast success, in Italy.

Track list 
 Perdermi – 3:05
 Questa estate strana – 2:17
 Se vuoi uccidimi – 3:17
 L'unica – 2:38
 Vieni più vicino – 4:33
 Ma domani – 3:37
 Un po' di sole – 2:54
 Dovrei – 2:49
 Tutte le cose – 2:37
 Un giorno normale – 2:52
 Questa estate strana (Acoustic version) – 2:22

2011 albums
Zero Assoluto albums